The United States Senate Committee on Commerce, Science, and Transportation is a standing committee of the United States Senate. Besides having broad jurisdiction over all matters concerning interstate commerce, science and technology policy, and transportation, the Senate Commerce Committee is one of the largest of the Senate's standing committees, with 28 members in the 117th Congress. The Commerce Committee has six subcommittees. It is chaired by Sen. Maria Cantwell (D-WA) with Sen. Roger Wicker (R-MS) as Ranking Member. The majority office is housed in the Dirksen Senate Office Building, and the minority office is located in the Hart Senate Office Building.

History
The committee has its roots in the Committee on Commerce and Manufacturers, which served as a standing committee in the early-1800s. This committee was split in two in the 1820s and remained in this configuration until the Legislative Reorganization Act of 1946. Under the LRA, the number of standing committees was dramatically decreased to increase congressional efficiency and increase institutional strength. As a result, the Committee on Commerce, the Committee on Manufactures, the Committee on Interstate Commerce, and the Committee on Interoceanic Canals were combined into the United States Senate Committee on Interstate and Foreign Commerce. In 1977, as a part of widespread committee reorganization, the committee was renamed the Committee on Commerce, Science, and Transportation and given additional oversight jurisdiction over nonmilitary aeronautical and space sciences, including the National Aeronautics and Space Administration (NASA).

The original progenitors of this committee were:
 United States Senate Committee on Commerce and Manufactures (1816–1825)
 United States Senate Committee on Commerce (1825–1946, 1961–1977)
 United States Senate Committee on Manufactures (1825–1855, 1864–1946)
 United States Senate Committee on Interstate Commerce (1885–1946)
 United States Senate Committee on Interoceanic Canals (1899–1946)
 United States Senate Committee on Interstate and Foreign Commerce (1946–1961)
 United States Senate Committee on Aeronautical and Space Sciences (1958–1977)

Jurisdiction
In accordance of Rule XXV of the United States Senate, all proposed legislation, messages, petitions, memorials, and other matters relating to the following subjects is referred to the Senate Committee on Commerce, Science, and Transportation:
 "Coast Guard;
 Coastal zone management;
 Communications;
 Highway safety;
 Inland waterways, except construction;
 Interstate commerce;
 Marine and ocean navigation, safety, and transportation, including navigational aspects of deepwater ports;
 Marine fisheries;
 Merchant marine and navigation;
 Nonmilitary aeronautical and space sciences;
 Oceans, weather, and atmospheric activities;
 Panama Canal and interoceanic canals generally, except as provided in subparagraph (c);
 Regulation of consumer products and services, including testing related to toxic substances, other than pesticides, and except for credit, financial services, and housing;
 Regulation of interstate common carriers, including railroads, buses, trucks, vessels, pipelines, and civil aviation;
 Science, engineering, and technology research and development and policy;
 Sports;
 Standards and measurement;
 Transportation; and,
 Transportation and commerce aspects of Outer Continental Shelf lands."
The Senate Commerce Committee is also charged to "study and review, on a comprehensive basis, all matters relating to science and technology, oceans policy, transportation, communications, and consumer affairs, and report thereon from time to time."

Members, 118th Congress

Chairs
The committee, under its various names, has been chaired by the following senators:

Committee on Commerce and Manufactures, 1816–1825

Committee on Commerce, 1825–1947

Committee on Interstate and Foreign Commerce, 1947–1961

Committee on Aeronautical and Space Sciences, 1958–1977

Committee on Commerce, 1961–1977

Committee on Commerce, Science, and Transportation, 1977–present

Historical committee rosters

117th Congress

Subcommittees

Source:

116th Congress

Subcommittees

115th Congress

Source

Notes

References

External links

Committee on Commerce, Science, and Transportation website (Archive) 
Senate Commerce, Science, and Transportation Committee. Legislation activity and reports, Congress.gov.

Commerce
Senate Committee
NASA oversight
Science and technology in the United States
Transportation government agencies of the United States
1816 establishments in the United States
Organizations established in 1816